Koppången is a Swedish song, with music composed originally for violin in 1998 by  for his folk music group Orsa Spelmän, which includes  his brothers Kalle Moraeus and Olle Moraeus.
The name and the inspiration for the song come from the wetlands and nature preserve , near the Moraeus family home in Orsa Municipality, Dalarna, Sweden.

In 1998 Orsa Spelmän recorded the instrumental version of Koppången  on the album  which was released on the label Mono Music (MMCD 013).

In 1999  Py Bäckman wrote lyrics for the song, in both Swedish and English  and mezzo-soprano
Anne Sofie von Otter recorded both versions on her album, 'Home for Christmas', which was released by Deutsche Grammophon.

The lyrics of Py Bäckman describe a country church in a winter scene at Christmas time. , music host on Sveriges Radio P2 comments:
 ("It is often difficult for new Christmas songs to establish themselves and become classics. One which has succeeded with that is Koppången.")

In the Yle Vega Swedish language  series about Christmas songs, music editor Bertil Blom writes: 

Sissel Kyrkjebø has sung and recorded Koppången several times, including in the 2001 live concert album, In Symphony, with Kalle Moraeus on violin.

Koppången has since been covered on over 50 recordings    by several artists,  including 
Helen Sjöholm, Sanna Nielsen, Malena Ernman, and Elisabeth Andreassen.
The song has been arranged for larger choral groups by Robert Sund and been recorded by several choirs such as  Orphei Drängar.

In December  2019, Anne Sofie Von Otter sang Koppången at Christmas concerts in the San Francisco Bay Area with New Century Chamber Orchestra. Music critic Philip Campbell writes:With a breathy, intimate quality, von Otter sang a gorgeous version of one of the best modern Christmas songs ever, "Koppangen" by Per-Erik Moraeus. The singer included it on her beautiful "Home for Christmas" album years ago, but it has actually improved with age.

For Christmas 2020, violinist Lynn Kuo (in Canada), soprano Julia Radosz,
and pianist Alena Hučková (both in Slovakia) 
performed Koppången as a "virtual trio" .

References

External links
Sissel Kyrkjebø - Koppången (Live) - 2001 Sissel Kyrkjebø sings Koppången with Kalle Moraeus on violin, recorded on the album In Symphony; Hosted by YouTube

Swedish Christmas songs
Sissel Kyrkjebø songs
Sanna Nielsen songs
Malena Ernman songs
Elisabeth Andreassen songs